John Price (born 22 November 1936) is a Welsh former footballer who played as a defender.

References

External links
 LFC History profile

1936 births
Welsh footballers
Liverpool F.C. players
Living people
Footballers from Aberystwyth
English Football League players
Aston Villa F.C. players
Walsall F.C. players
Shrewsbury Town F.C. players
Association football fullbacks